The City was a studio band active during the mid-1980s. It was formed by Peter McIan at Chrysalis Records after the demise of Men at Work in 1985, using some of the same talent such as the drummer Jerry Speiser.

They released one studio album, titled Foundation, in 1986. It produced one hit song, "Planets in Motion", which was played in heavy rotation on American radio at the time, and was briefly a popular wedding song in the late 1980s. Some of their pieces appeared on MTV, but the band never toured.

The album was released in the UK in 1987.

Personnel
The band consisted of several well-known session musicians of the time:
Billy Trudel - Lead vocals (Warpipes) (Elton John)
Peter McIan - Backing vocals, keyboards (as well as producing the album)
Stuart Mathis (later associated with The Wallflowers) - Guitar
Jerry Speiser (from Men at Work) - Drums and percussion
Wade Biery - Bass

Foundation track listing
1. "Season Of The Heart"
2. "Invisible Man"
3. "Aim For The Heart"
4. "Parallel Lines"
5. "Planets In Motion"
6. "Walk Away"
7. "From This Day On"
8. "Fatal Attraction"
9. "When The Smoke Clears"

References

Alternative rock groups
Chrysalis Records artists